The Pink Panther 2 is a 2009 American comedy-mystery film directed by Harald Zwart. It is the eleventh installment in The Pink Panther film series and the sequel to the 2006 film The Pink Panther, a reboot of the popular comedy series. The film was released on February 6, 2009 in North America. In the film, Inspector Clouseau must team up with detectives from other countries to rout a daring burglar, The Tornado, who has returned after a decade's inactivity.

Steve Martin, who reprised the role of Clouseau, originated by Peter Sellers, polished the original script written by Scott Neustadter and Michael H. Weber in November 2006. MGM, partnering with Columbia Pictures on the sequel, hired the team of Lowell Ganz and Babaloo Mandel to perform a further rewrite in January 2007. Principal photography began in Paris on August 20, 2007, then moved to Boston several weeks later, where filming ended on November 2, 2007.

John Cleese replaces Kevin Kline as Chief Inspector Dreyfus with Jean Reno and Emily Mortimer reprising their roles as Clouseau's partner Ponton and Clouseau's girlfriend Nicole. Beyoncé did not return for the sequel. Aishwarya Rai Bachchan appears as the criminology expert Sonia Solandres. Andy García, Yuki Matsuzaki and Alfred Molina round out the cast as detectives Italian Inspector Vincenzo Brancaleone, Japanese Inspector Kenji Mazuto and British Chief Inspector Randall Pepperidge, respectively. It was released on Blu-ray Disc and DVD on June 23, 2009.

Plot
When “The Tornado”, a master thief, steals priceless artifacts from around the world, the French government assembles a “Dream Team” of investigators to solve the case. Meanwhile, Inspector Clouseau is reassigned from his task as a parking officer by Chief Inspector Dreyfus to join the detectives in Japan, site of the Tornado's latest heist. After Clouseau immediately crosses the "borders" of France at an airport gate, news instantly breaks that the Pink Panther diamond has been stolen, prompting Clouseau to gloat that his presence has kept the diamond safe and that he had known it would happen all along. Clouseau meets the other members of the Dream Team: Detective Randall Pepperidge from Great Britain; Vincenzo Brancaleoni from Italy; Kenji Mazuto, an electronics specialist from Japan; and Sonia Solandres, a researcher and criminology expert from India. 

The team then goes to Rome to investigate a black market fence, Alonso Avellaneda. Assuming Avellaneda is the Tornado, the Dream Team question him while Clouseau snoops around. Avellaneda demonstrates that he lacks a characteristic bullet wound the Tornado received years ago; after the detectives leave, Avellaneda then meets with the real Tornado. That night, Clouseau and his partner Ponton spy on Avellaneda at a restaurant using an audio bug. The mission is compromised when they find Vincenzo and Nicole, Clouseau's girlfriend, together at the restaurant. Banned from the restaurant for burning it down months earlier, Clouseau disguises himself as a dancer and switches the bug to Nicole's table, burning down the restaurant again in the process. Meanwhile, the Tornado steals the Pope's ring, souring public opinion against the Dream Team. When Clouseau's incompetence aggravates the situation, he is voted off the team. Clouseau is later called to an office and finds that the Tornado has apparently killed himself, leaving a suicide note claiming he destroyed the Pink Panther – considering it so beautiful that he could not allow anyone else to own it – and left the other treasures to be recovered. Examining a key found in the Pope's Chambers, the Dream Team match the dead man's DNA with DNA recovered from when the Tornado was shot, and believe they have solved the case, but Clouseau remains unconvinced.

A celebration is thrown in the Dream Team's honor, although Clouseau is uninvited. While wandering near the celebration, he realizes something after seeing the license plate of Sonia's car and calls Ponton. Clouseau tries to tell Dreyfus that the real thief is still at large, but is ignored. Dreyfus announces to the group that Clouseau believes Sonia was the thief, and the detectives jokingly work out a plausible explanation: as the Tornado's ex-lover, she would have in-depth knowledge of his methods, and could have drawn attention to the thefts of the other artifacts, leaving her free to sell the Pink Panther. Nicole, realizing Clouseau could be correct, asks Sonia to empty her purse. After initially trying to leave, Sonia ultimately pulls out a gun, threatening to shoot Nicole, before shooting Clouseau, but the bullet ricochets off his Légion d'honneur medal. A chase ensues, with the Dream Team suffering due to various accidents caused by Clouseau's clumsiness. Finally cornered, Sonia threatens to destroy the Pink Panther and, goaded by Clouseau, she does. Before she can escape however, Sonia is knocked out by Ponton and arrested. Clouseau reveals that Sonia destroyed a fake gem, as Clouseau kept the real diamond in his possession in order to protect it, while the Pink Panther at the museum was swapped with a replica he was given before leaving France. Furthermore, The Tornado, an expert on gems, would have recognized the fake Pink Panther, allowing Clouseau to deduce that his suicide note was forged and that he was murdered. Clouseau then reveals that he had given a ticket to Sonia's car two days before the Pink Panther was stolen – contradicting her alibi of being delayed to the original crime scene by her flight – which confirmed to him that Sonia was the culprit and that she used the Dream Team, and by extension Clouseau's mishaps, as a strategic cover. Dreyfus tries to claim credit for having appointed Clouseau to his parking job, which Clouseau, remembering Dreyfus told him to deny this to anyone who asked, rebukes.

Later, Clouseau marries Nicole in a ceremony officiated by Dreyfus and attended by the Dream Team, ending in chaos when Dreyfus accidentally destroys a security camera with a champagne cork, summoning the Black Berets again like earlier in the film. In the confusion, Clouseau and Nicole immediately leave for their honeymoon as the animated Pink Panther watches, before walking towards the fray and closing the doors, winking at the camera as it irises out.

Cast
Steve Martin as Inspector Jacques Clouseau   A clumsy police officer and now-recognized "Protector of the Pink Panther", who joins the Dream Team to bring the Tornado to justice and recover the Pink Panther once more.
Jean Reno as Gendarme Gilbert Ponton  Clouseau's assistant and sidekick.
Emily Mortimer as Nicole Durant  Clouseau's assistant and romantic interest. 
Andy García as Vincenzo Roccara Squarcialupi Brancaleoni An Italian businessman who joins the Dream Team.
Alfred Molina as Randall Pepperidge  A British police detective who joins the Dream Team.
Yuki Matsuzaki as Kenji Mazuto  A Japanese technology expert who joins the Dream Team.
 Aishwarya Rai Bachchan as Sonia Solandres/The Tornado An Indian criminologist and renowned chronicler of the Tornado who joins the Dream Team.
John Cleese as Chief Inspector Charles Dreyfus, Clouseau's boss who often gives him meaningless assignments to get him out of his hair.
Lily Tomlin as Mrs. Yvette Berenger, a manners teacher who often calls Clouseau into her office to discuss his suggestive manners and prejudices.
Johnny Hallyday as Laurence Millikin/The Tornado, an expert thief who specializes in stealing valuable artifacts. 
Jeremy Irons as Alonso Avellaneda, a known fence and associate of The Tornado. 
Geoffrey Palmer as Commissioner Joubert 
 Yevgeni Lazarev as the Pope.
Christiane Amanpour as herself.
Sharon Tay as CNN Reporter.
Jack Metzger as Antoine

Production
The film was shot in Paris, France, and Boston, Bedford, Chelsea, Westwood, and Winchester, Massachusetts and Trenton, New Jersey from August 20 to November 2, 2007.

Release
The Pink Panther 2 was theatrically released on February 6, 2009 by Metro-Goldwyn-Mayer and Columbia Pictures and was released on DVD and Blu-ray on June 23, 2009 by 20th Century Fox Home Entertainment and MGM Home Entertainment.

Soundtrack
Composer Christophe Beck returns to compose the score for the sequel as well as adapting Henry Mancini's Pink Panther theme.

The Pink Panther Theme
Habanera Para Baile
Sonia's Love
Finale in C Major
Bridal Chorus

Reception

Critical response
The Pink Panther 2 received worse reviews from critics than the original. On Rotten Tomatoes the film has an approval rating of 13% based on 137 reviews, with an average rating of 3.7/10. The site's critical consensus reads, "Underutilizing its talented cast, The Pink Panther 2 is little more than a series of lame slapstick gags". On Metacritic, the film has a weighted average score of 36 out of 100 based on 30 critics, indicating "generally unfavorable reviews". Audiences polled by CinemaScore gave the film an average grade of "B+" on an A+ to F scale, up from the first film's "B".

Box office
The Pink Panther 2 grossed $35.9 million in North America and $40 million in other territories for a worldwide total of $75.9 million, against a budget of $70 million. The film made $11.6 million in its opening weekend, finishing fourth at the box office. The film was released in the United Kingdom on February 13, 2009, and opened at #8.

Future
On November 19, 2020, Metro-Goldwyn Mayer announced that a new Pink Panther film is in the works with Sonic the Hedgehog director Jeff Fowler attached to direct and Chris Bremner attached to write the script. Unlike the previous films which only focused on Inspector Clouseau, the new film will focus on both Clouseau and the animated Pink Panther cartoon character.

See also
 List of The Pink Panther cartoons

References

External links
 
 

20 Questions with Inspector Clouseau

The Pink Panther 2 Photo Call in Paris - Gallery

The Pink Panther films
2009 films
2009 action comedy films
2000s comedy mystery films
2000s police comedy films
American action comedy films
American comedy mystery films
American crime comedy films
American films with live action and animation
American sequel films
American slapstick comedy films
Columbia Pictures films
Films directed by Harald Zwart
Films produced by Robert Simonds
Films scored by Christophe Beck
Films set in London
Films set in Paris
Films set in Rome
Films shot in Boston
Films shot in Massachusetts
Films shot in New Jersey
Films with screenplays by Scott Neustadter and Michael H. Weber
Films with screenplays by Steve Martin
Metro-Goldwyn-Mayer films
2000s English-language films
2000s American films
2000s British films